Elections to Lisburn Borough Council were held on 21 May 1997 on the same day as the other Northern Irish local government elections. The election used five district electoral areas to elect a total of 30 councillors.

Election results

Note: "Votes" are the first preference votes.

Districts summary

|- class="unsortable" align="centre"
!rowspan=2 align="left"|Ward
! % 
!Cllrs
! % 
!Cllrs
! %
!Cllrs
! %
!Cllrs
! % 
!Cllrs
! %
!Cllrs
! % 
!Cllrs
! %
!Cllrs
!rowspan=2|TotalCllrs
|- class="unsortable" align="center"
!colspan=2 bgcolor="" | UUP
!colspan=2 bgcolor="" | Sinn Féin
!colspan=2 bgcolor="" | Alliance
!colspan=2 bgcolor="" | DUP
!colspan=2 bgcolor="" | SDLP
!colspan=2 bgcolor="" | UDP
!colspan=2 bgcolor="" | Conservative
!colspan=2 bgcolor="white"| Others
|-
|align="left"|Downshire
|bgcolor="40BFF5"|39.0
|bgcolor="40BFF5"|2
|0.0
|0
|17.0
|1
|28.0
|1
|0.0
|0
|0.0
|0
|16.0
|1
|0.0
|0
|5
|-
|align="left"|Dunmurry Cross
|20.0
|1
|bgcolor="#008800"|50.1
|bgcolor="#008800"|4
|3.2
|0
|2.6
|0
|16.2
|1
|0.0
|0
|0.0
|0
|7.9
|1
|7
|-
|align="left"|Killultagh
|bgcolor="40BFF5"|47.1
|bgcolor="40BFF5"|3
|0.0
|0
|9.1
|0
|24.1
|1
|17.0
|1
|0.0
|0
|0.0
|0
|2.7
|0
|5
|-
|align="left"|Lisburn Town North
|bgcolor="40BFF5"|33.8
|bgcolor="40BFF5"|3
|0.0
|0
|20.3
|1
|9.8
|0
|0.0
|0
|10.5
|1
|0.0
|0
|25.6
|2
|7
|-
|align="left"|Lisburn Town South
|bgcolor="40BFF5"|54.4
|bgcolor="40BFF5"|4
|0.0
|0
|19.4
|1
|9.3
|0
|0.0
|0
|15.8
|1
|0.0
|0
|1.1
|0
|6
|- class="unsortable" class="sortbottom" style="background:#C9C9C9"
|align="left"| Total
|36.6
|13
|13.7
|4
|13.0
|3
|13.2
|2
|5.8
|2
|5.0
|2
|2.9
|1
|9.8
|3
|30
|-
|}

Districts results

Downshire

1993: 3 x UUP, 1 x DUP, 1 x Conservative
1997: 2 x UUP, 1 x DUP, 1 x Alliance, 1 x Conservative
1997-2001 Change: Alliance gain from UUP

Dunmurry Cross

1993: 3 x Sinn Féin, 2 x UUP, 2 x SDLP
1997: 4 x Sinn Féin, 1 x SDLP, 1 x UUP, 1 x Independent Nationalist
1993-1997 Change: Sinn Féin gain from UUP, Independent Nationalist leaves SDLP

Killultagh

1993: 3 x UUP, 1 x DUP, 1 x SDLP
1997: 3 x UUP, 1 x DUP, 1 x SDLP
1993-1997 Change: No change

Lisburn Town North

1993: 4 x UUP, 1 x Alliance, 1 x DUP, 1 x Independent Unionist
1997: 3 x UUP, 1 x Alliance, 1 x UDP, 1 x Independent Unionist, 1 x Protestant Unionist
1993-1997 Change: UDP gain from UUP, Protestant Unionist leaves DUP

Lisburn Town South

1993: 4 x UUP, 1 x Alliance, 1 x UDP
1997: 4 x UUP, 1 x Alliance, 1 x UDP
1993-1997 Change: No change

References

Lisburn City Council elections
Lisburn